In Greek mythology, Lelex (Ancient Greek: Λέλεξ, gen. Λέλεγος) was a king of Megara and regarded as the ancestor of the Leleges.

Family 
Lelex was the son of Poseidon and Libya, the daughter of Epaphus. He was the father of Bias, Cleson, and possibly of Pterelaus. Lelex' successor, his son Cleson fathered Pylas who in turn begat Sciron, the Megarian warlord or otherwise, the malefactor of Theseus.

Mythology 
In the twelfth generation after Car (son of Phoroneus) reigned in the Carian land, Lelex immigrated from Egypt into Greece where he became king of Megara. His tomb was shown below Nisaea, the acropolis of Megara.

Notes

References 

 Pausanias, Description of Greece with an English Translation by W.H.S. Jones, Litt.D., and H.A. Ormerod, M.A., in 4 Volumes. Cambridge, MA, Harvard University Press; London, William Heinemann Ltd. 1918. Online version at the Perseus Digital Library
 Pausanias, Graeciae Descriptio. 3 vols. Leipzig, Teubner. 1903.  Greek text available at the Perseus Digital Library.
 Pseudo-Apollodorus, The Library with an English Translation by Sir James George Frazer, F.B.A., F.R.S. in 2 Volumes, Cambridge, MA, Harvard University Press; London, William Heinemann Ltd. 1921. Online version at the Perseus Digital Library. Greek text available from the same website.
 Publius Ovidius Naso, Metamorphoses translated by Brookes More (1859-1942). Boston, Cornhill Publishing Co. 1922. Online version at the Perseus Digital Library.
 Publius Ovidius Naso, Metamorphoses. Hugo Magnus. Gotha (Germany). Friedr. Andr. Perthes. 1892. Latin text available at the Perseus Digital Library.

Kings in Greek mythology
Egyptian characters in Greek mythology
Megarian characters in Greek mythology